Kida or KIDA may refer to:

 Kida (surname), including a list of people with the name
 Kida (singer) (Orhidea Latifi, born 1997), a Kosovo-Albanian singer
 KIDA, a former television station in Sun Valley, Idaho, U.S.
 Kida Station, in Ama, Aichi Prefecture, Japan
 5140 Kida, a main-belt asteroid
 Idaho Falls Regional Airport, Idaho, U.S., ICAO airport code KIDA
 Kida, a character from Atlantis: The Lost Empire
 Masaomi Kida, a character from the Japanese series Durarara!!